Thedinghausen is a Samtgemeinde ("collective municipality") in the district of Verden, in Lower Saxony, Germany. Its seat is in the village Thedinghausen. Until 1972 the incorporated municipalities had been an exclave of the district Braunschweig.

The Samtgemeinde Thedinghausen consists of the following municipalities:
 Blender 
 Emtinghausen
 Riede 
 Thedinghausen

References 

Samtgemeinden in Lower Saxony